David Alfred Jones (9 March 1920 – 18 April 1990) was a Welsh cricketer.  Jones was a right-handed batsman who bowled right-arm medium pace.  He was born at Aberkenfig, Glamorgan.

Jones made a single first-class appearance for Glamorgan in 1938 against Sir J Cahn's XI at Rodney Parade, Newport.  In the match he scored 6 runs in his only first-class innings and took 2/22 with the ball.

Jones died at Pen-y-fai, Glamorgan, on 18 April 1990.

References

External links
David Jones at Cricinfo
David Jones at CricketArchive

1920 births
1990 deaths
Sportspeople from Bridgend County Borough
People from Glamorgan
Welsh cricketers
Glamorgan cricketers